Baião is a municipality in Porto District in Portugal. The population in 2011 was 20,522, in an area of 174.53 km².

Baião received a charter from Manuel I on 1 September 1513.

The present Mayor is Paulo Pereira, elected from the Socialist Party. The municipal holiday is August 24.

Parishes

Administratively, the municipality is divided into 14 civil parishes (freguesias):

 Ancede e Ribadouro (town of Ancede)
 Baião (Santa Leocádia) e Mesquinhata
 Campelo e Ovil (town of Baião)
 Frende
 Gestaçô
 Gove
 Grilo
 Loivos da Ribeira e Tresouras
 Loivos do Monte
 Santa Cruz do Douro e São Tomé de Covelas
 Santa Marinha do Zêzere (town)
 Teixeira e Teixeiró
 Valadares
 Viariz

Notable people 
 Soeiro Pereira Gomes (1909 in Gestaçô – 1949) a Portuguese writer of realist influence 
 António Mota (born 1957) a Portuguese writer for children and young people.
 Ricardo José Vaz Alves Monteiro (born 1983 in Gestaçô), known as Tarantini, a former footballer with 495 club caps

References

External links

Town Hall official website

Municipalities of Porto District
People from Baião, Portugal